Irkut may stand for:

 Irkut (river), a tributary of the Angara in Russia
 Irkut Corporation, an aircraft manufacturer